The 1921–22 British Home Championship was an international football tournament played during the 1921–22 season between the British Home Nations. Scotland were victorious as part of a string of seven victories during the 1920s. England and Wales came joint second with Ireland coming last.

The competition began with Wales, the other strong side of the decade, gaining an immediate advantage, capitalising on a weak draw between England and Ireland to take two points from Scotland at home. This momentum was not sustained however, and Scotland bounced back to beat Ireland as Wales lost 1–0 to England in Liverpool. In the final matches all four teams could still claim victory, but a tame draw between Wales and Ireland left the deciding game between England and Scotland. Despite a strong performance from England, the Scots proved the better side, running out 1–0 winners to claim the title. By virtue of their draws with Ireland, England and Wales were equal on points in second places whilst the same draws gave Ireland their only points of the competition.

Table

Results

Winning squad

References

1921–22 in English football
1921–22 in Scottish football
Brit
1921 in British sport
1922 in British sport
1921-22
1921–22 in Northern Ireland association football